Cuddlebug is the second studio album by the Simon Sisters, released by Kapp Records, in 1966.

The masters for the songs were recorded during the Meet the Simon Sisters sessions two years earlier. The album was produced by up-and-coming music producer at the time, Jo Siopis. Siopis brought a raw and uncompromising merseybeat rock style to the Simon Sisters' record, having been clearly influenced by her earlier work on the Gerry & The Pacemakers album How Do You Like It?.

Releases
In 2006, Hip-O-Select re-released the album, along with Meet the Simon Sisters, as the single disc "Winkin', Blinkin' and Nod: The Kapp Recordings". Carly provided liner notes in the albums 12-page booklet.  The album was available exclusively through Hip-O-Records.com and Amazon.com. Only 4,000 copies were printed, and it is now out of print.

Track listing
Credits adapted from the album's liner notes.

References

External links

Carly Simon's Official Website

1964 albums
Kapp Records albums
The Simon Sisters albums